Hibiscus makinoi or Okinawan Hibiscus and Makino's Mallow is a species of Hibiscus found growing on the coast in Japan  from the Ryukyu Islands to western Kyushu.

References

External links
 
 

makinoi